Anant Prasad Singh was an Indian politician belonging to Indian National Congress. He was elected as a member of Bihar Legislative Assembly from Mirganj in 1969 and 1972. He died on 27 January 2019 at the age of 92.

References

2019 deaths
Indian National Congress politicians
Members of the Bihar Legislative Assembly
1920s births
Indian National Congress politicians from Bihar